Hamza Pasha (Turkish: Hamza Paşa) may refer to:

Hamza Bey (died 1460), Ottoman commander, bey of Nicopolis
Hamza Pasha, governor of Thessaly, Ottoman governor of Thessaly (1459-1462) in succession of Turahanoğlu Ömer Bey
Hamza Pasha, beylerbey of Egypt (1683–87) and wali of Damascus (1688–89), see List of Ottoman governors of Egypt
Tevkii Hamza Hamid Pasha, Ottoman Grand Vizier (1763)
Silahdar Mahir Hamza Pasha, Ottoman governor of Egypt (1765–67) and Grand Vizier (1768)
Mahmoud Hamza Pasha, Admiral of the Egyptian Navy (1946–1948)